Early on the morning of 22 March 2011, Rebecca Coriam (born 11 March 1987), a British crewmember on the cruise ship Disney Wonder, was captured by CCTV in the crew lounge, having a phone conversation that appeared to be causing her some emotional difficulty. Several hours later, she missed the beginning of her work shift and could not be located anywhere aboard the ship, then off the Pacific coast of Mexico. Her disappearance was the first such incident in the history of Disney Cruise Line.

Coriam's disappearance remains under investigation, and her whereabouts since the phone conversation have not been established. Her parents have been critical of Disney's handling of the investigation, believing the company knows more than it claims to and has been more interested in avoiding unfavourable publicity than cooperating with investigators. Her family settled a lawsuit against Disney out of court in 2016.

The Coriam family have been supported by British government officials, who have instituted policies allowing for more comprehensive investigations of such incidents in the future, and advocates for the relatives of many other crew and passengers who have been reported missing from cruise ships over the last decade.

Life

Coriam was born on 11 March 1987 in Countess of Chester Hospital, Chester, England. She grew up in Chester with her parents, sister Rachael and two foster brothers, finishing Chester Catholic High School. In her youth, she also worked at the Chester Zoo, where other relatives had worked. A memorial bench to her grandparents Kevin and Dolores is on the zoo grounds.

She joined the British Army cadets in her teens and attended Plymouth University at Plymouth, where she studied sports science. Later she got a Staff Volunteer position within the cadets and participated in some outdoor events. She took additional studies in youth studies at Liverpool Hope University and then spent four months teaching sports at Camp America in the U.S. state of Maine.

In June 2010, she went to London to interview for the Disney Cruise positions; after being hired she went to the company's theme parks in Florida for training. After four months on cruises to the Bahamas, where the ships are registered, she went back to Britain for two months off. When she returned to work, it was on the Disney Wonder, based in the Port of Los Angeles. She visited all its ports of call on the Mexican Riviera and went through the Panama Canal.

She returned to Chester for two weeks during this period when her grandfather died. It was the last time her family saw her in person.

Disappearance

Coriam returned to the Wonder and her duties as a youth worker, maintaining contact with her family via Facebook and Skype. Six weeks later, on 21 March 2011, the day the ship left Los Angeles, she sent what would be her last message to her parents via Facebook, saying she would call the next day.

Her mother grew concerned when, following her reply, twelve hours went by without a response.

At 9 a.m. Pacific Daylight Time that morning on the Wonder, off the coast of Mexico bound for Puerto Vallarta and Cabo San Lucas, Coriam had missed the start of her shift. She was not in her room or anywhere else on the ship, and did not respond to pages over the ship's public address system. A review of CCTV footage found one appearance of her, timestamped 5:45 a.m. An early, unverified account, purportedly from another crew member, claimed she had gone overboard at 3 a.m., nearly three hours earlier.

In the video, Coriam is talking on one of the ship's internal phones in a crew area. She appears distraught. A young man walks up to her and appears to ask if everything is all right. Her mouth can clearly be read to be saying "Yeah, fine", after which she hangs up. She then walks away, pushing her hair back and putting her hands in her back pockets, mannerisms her parents say were common for her. There has been no record of her presence anywhere since then.

Investigations

The crew searched the ship for her. Ships of the U.S. Coast Guard and Mexican Navy searched the international waters through which the Wonder had been sailing during the hours in which Coriam could have gone overboard, if that was what had occurred. They likewise found nothing.

Since the Wonder is registered in the Bahamas, a detective from the Royal Bahamas Police Force (RBPF) flew to the ship to investigate once it had returned to Los Angeles, three days after the disappearance. He was reported to have undertaken "several days of onboard investigations".

Mike and Annmaria Coriam, Rebecca's parents, were flown out from England to meet the ship when it returned. They met the Bahamian detective and said he told them he had spent only one day on board investigating before flying back home. The detective also told them that he had interviewed only a few crew members, and none of the passengers. The Coriams claimed Disney kept them in a car with blacked-out windows and brought them on board via a little-used side entrance after all the passengers had disembarked. The Wonder'''s captain gave his condolences and expressed his theory that Rebecca had been washed overboard by a wave while at the crew pool, a theory the Coriams doubted due to the high walls around it. After that, they were taken to a meeting with Disney executives and the woman Rebecca had been speaking to on the phone.

On the day before the first anniversary of her disappearance, her father received an email from a woman who claimed she had seen Rebecca with a dark-haired man on the street in Venice the previous August. The woman said she was "85% sure" it was Rebecca, and seeing the family's website had roused her memory. "It was just an email but it seemed legitimate," said her uncle. "It was very upsetting for everyone to think she could be out there somewhere after all this time." He wondered how she could have got there without her passport, which had been among the belongings her parents had recovered from her quarters.

The Guardian article

In October 2011, journalist Jon Ronson took the Wonder along the same route and made discreet inquiries while aboard. With the Coriams' permission, he wrote about it in The Guardian. Several crew members, none of whom wanted their names used, who had been on the ship at the time of Rebecca's disappearance, spoke to him. They suggested that more was known about her fate than Disney or the Bahamanian police had publicly admitted.

Many were circumspect. "It didn't happen," a bartender told Ronson. "You know that's the answer I have to give." After touring the areas of the ship open to passengers, he decided that Coriam had probably slipped and fallen while jogging on the Deck 4 jogging track. The railings there were low enough for that accident to happen, and she regularly kept herself in shape that way. However, the track was well covered by disguised security cameras.

He shared this theory with a deck worker, who told him he was mistaken. Coriam had, according to him, actually gone overboard from the crew pool on Deck 5. "I was on the ship that day." the man said. "Everyone knows". He cited a flip flop found in the area as proof. After the reporter returned, "Melissa", a woman whom the Coriams had told to contact him, told him that the day after the disappearance, flowers were placed on the wall near the pool, apparently by the company. "It really stirred things up," the woman recalled. "Why [we]re they putting them there? Nothing was clear."

When he took a look at the crew pool, visible from the fore of Deck 10, he doubted these claims. Around the railings on the pool is a steel wall high enough to completely block any view (another crew member had told him it was a popular place to go when not working as their cabins were very small and it was a place crew members could be themselves, away from guests). There were conspicuously mounted security cameras as well. Although he allowed that they could have been placed since the incident, Ronson did not see how anyone could have jumped or fallen from there.

But all crew members who spoke with him insisted that Coriam had gone overboard from the crew pool. "Disney knows exactly what happened", one said. "Everything here is taped. There's CCTV everywhere. Disney has the tape." Near the end of a voyage, another crew member who sought him out explained in further detail that even though the walls around the pool are high, the seas were rough at the time and she could have been tossed off the ship, especially if the deck and walls were slippery. He said a friend of his had to get someone inside in similar conditions, and the offence of being outside on the pool deck in such conditions was serious enough that Disney sent that person home from the cruise.

Theories

Since Rebecca was not found on the ship despite a thorough search, investigators concluded that she went overboard, possibly as a result of a rogue wave. The Coriams and their lawyer say they never received a copy of the final report as they were promised by the Bahamanian police; British detectives who did receive it have refused repeated Freedom of Information Act requests for a copy on the grounds that it contains restricted personal information.

A crew member told Ronson that the call was taped. Several others believed it was with a romantic partner. "She was in a relationship, and there were problems, and it was upsetting her," "Melissa" told Ronson. "It was a very, very intense relationship. It was great and then it was awful ... I can't think of any other reason why she'd have been upset and wandering around by herself at 6 am." However, she says Coriam was on the phone not with the partner but a mutual friend. On the anniversary of Rebecca's disappearance, her parents told the Liverpool Echo that they heard the names of a young woman and older man on the ship mentioned as possibly being involved in a love triangle with her, and called for them to come forward. They also disclosed that they had heard Disney had sent some additional footage to the FBI for enhancement, but could not say what that footage might contain.

They recall her personality as constantly cheerful and upbeat, traits that got her the Disney job in the first place. When her parents visited her quarters after the disappearance, they found passes she had obtained for them and her sister to visit Disneyland Paris, a gift trip she was apparently planning to surprise them with on her next break at home. These plans, as well as her continuing Facebook exchanges with her mother, argue for them against suicide.

"Melissa", who had last seen Coriam at 11 p.m. the previous night, told Ronson that she believed Coriam went out to the crew pool, one of her favourite places on the ship, to be alone and relax for a while. While there, she might have climbed up and sat on the wall, and then fallen. "Bex was a bit of a risk taker," she said.

However, "Melissa" was dismissive of the suggestion that the slippers allegedly found near the pool, which were included among the belongings returned to Coriam's parents, had been hers. "Mike and Ann showed them to me," she told Ronson. "They were too big. They weren't her style. They were pink and flowery and Hawaiian. I'd never seen her wear them. Why didn't Disney come to me or her girlfriend and say, 'Can you identify these as Bex's?'"

While the Coriams later claimed the flip flops were too small, they were unable to find anyone on the ship who had seen her wearing them and learned that no forensics had been done on them. In 2016, private investigators working for the family said that they had conclusively established that the footwear did not belong to the couple's daughter. Not only were they not in a style she would wear, they noted, the flip-flops had another crewmember's name and cabin number written on them. The Coriams said this led them to strongly doubt Disney's claim that they had been found in the pool area, as well as its theory that Rebecca was swept or fell overboard from there.

It was also noted that in the video of the phone call, Rebecca's clothes appear very large; her friends and fellow crew have speculated that they may have been someone else's.

Labour MP Chris Matheson, who has represented the City of Chester constituency since the 2015 election, believes Coriam was a crime victim, possibly murdered or sexually assaulted. "The more you look into this the more it smells rotten; the more it smells like a crime has taken place", he told the Echo the year of his election. He claims to have a copy of the original police report with "compelling" evidence to that effect. John Anderson, a private investigator who has worked with both the Coriams and Matheson, says records show the seas around the Wonder were normal that night, casting doubt on Disney's "rogue wave" claim. He also says that any wave capable of taking her off the ship would have caused visible damage to it as well.

Baron John Prescott, former Deputy Prime Minister under Tony Blair and now a life peer in the House of Lords, has also taken an interest in the case. He believes Rebecca was thrown overboard rather than having fallen. He has also called for laws that would allow British authorities to investigate their own citizens' deaths on cruise ships in international waters.

Criticism of investigation

Ronson reported that at the time his article was published, the Coriams had received no further updates from Disney or the RBPF on the progress of the investigation. "[W]henever we call anyone, all they say is, 'The investigation is ongoing,'" Mike Coriam said. "We've tried emailing, telling them how we feel, how it's getting harder ... But nothing. Just, 'It's ongoing.'" The Bahaman police officer assigned to the case never returned Ronson's calls.

The Coriams have been joined in their criticism of the investigation by British government officials, Rebecca's friends among the crew, and advocates for victims of other incidents on cruise ships and their families. The latter, especially, note that 170 passengers and crew have disappeared from cruise ships since 2000, many without being seriously investigated or widely reported. All critics contend that Disney, like other cruise operators, is more interested in avoiding adverse publicity related to these incidents than anything else.

In November 2011, Stephen Mosley, then the Coriams' MP, brought the case up in the House of Commons. "The investigation into Rebecca's disappearance was appalling," he told Mike Penning, the Minister for Shipping.

"[T]he Bahamian authorities made virtually no attempt at investigating Rebecca's disappearance," he continued, saying the RBPF was "internationally recognised as almost toothless ... Very few people know that when they board a cruise ship that they are so poorly protected." Countries such as the Bahamas, often criticized for the lax standards of such "flag of convenience" ship registrations, did not have the investigative capabilities to deal with such incidents.

Penning responded by announcing that the Marine Accident Investigation Branch would investigate all deaths or disappearances of British citizens from vessels anywhere in the world, paralleling similar legislation signed by U.S. President Barack Obama that gives the Federal Bureau of Investigation that authority in the event of the death or disappearance of any American citizen. The Government would also work through the International Maritime Organization to increase international cooperation on such investigations. Penning, too, was critical of Disney, saying the company was "more interested in getting the ship back to sea than in investigating the case of the missing member of their crew".

"In other corporations, police get involved," said Kendall Carver, an American who founded the lobbying group International Cruise Victims after his own daughter's 2004 disappearance from the Celebrity Mercury. "On cruise ships they have, quote, security officers, but they work for the cruise lines. They aren't going to do anything when the lines get sued." Miami lawyer Jim Walker, publisher of the blog Cruise Law News'', which is highly critical of the industry, concurs. "The Coriam family does not deserve Mickey Mouse games," he commented in Ronson's article. Walker later represented the Coriams in a suit against Disney in American courts; they settled with the company in 2015 for an undisclosed sum and an agreement not to discuss the case publicly.

Carver and Walker both believe Disney has more evidence than it has shown, particularly security footage of the area by the pool, and is covering up knowledge of what happened out of fear of adverse publicity. "If there's a video that shows your daughter going overboard," Carver told Ronson, "that's the end of the story. There's no way someone can go off a ship and it not be recorded." Melissa told Ronson it was implausible that there was no footage since the pool is close to a number of other important offices, such as human resources and the payroll department, where money and sensitive documents were kept. She believed any coverup by Disney may have been as much about protecting themselves from charges of negligence, since the pool is just below the ship's bridge and would thus be the portion of the ship where a fall would most likely be seen by someone in a position to start a rescue. "If it was 6 a.m. and they were doing their job and watching the front, someone must have seen her go over," she told Ronson. "Or if they didn't, they're covering up why they didn't."

Disney told Ronson that they are deferring to the RBPF. "[They have told] us the investigation is still ongoing. They have not shared a timeline with us, either." Their spokesperson refused to comment on specifics about whether a tape of the phone call or additional security-camera video exists. "[W]e wish we knew what happened as much as anyone ... Rebecca's disappearance has been difficult and heartbreaking for everyone."

See also 

 Disappearance of Sarm Heslop
 Incidents at Walt Disney World
 List of people who disappeared mysteriously at sea

References

External links
Official Find Rebecca website
International Cruise Victims

2010s missing person cases
2011 in Mexico
Disney Cruise Line
March 2011 events in Mexico
Missing person cases in Mexico
People lost at sea